O Delfim is a Portuguese film directed by Fernando Lopes. It was based on the book with the same name by José Cardoso Pires. It was the Portuguese submission for the Academy Award for Best Foreign Language Film in 2002.

References

External links 
 
Portuguese drama films
2002 films